The surname Giles or Gyles comes from the given name Giles, for which multiple origins have been suggested.

Notable people with the surname Giles
 Adam Giles (born 1973), Australian politician, Chief Minister of the Northern Territory (2013–2016)
 Alan Giles (priest) (1902–1975), Anglican priest, RAF Chaplain-in-Chief (1953–1959), Dean of Jersey (1959–1970)
 Alan Giles, British businessman, CEO of HMV Group (1999–2006)
 Alfred Giles (disambiguation), multiple people
 Alice Giles (born c. 1961), Australian classical harpist
 Annabel Giles (born 1959), Welsh model, panellist and novelist
 Andrew Giles (born 1973), Australian politician
 Anstey Giles (1860–1944), full name William Anstey Giles, surgeon and medical administrator in South Australia
 Aquila Giles (1758–1822), American lawyer, politician and soldier
 Archie Giles (1895–1941), Australian rules footballer
 Arthur Giles (1864–1936), British gynecologist
 Ashley Giles (born 1973), English cricketer
 Barney M. Giles (1892–1984), American military officer, commander of the Fourth Air Force (1942–1943)
 Bascom Giles (James Bascom Giles; 1900–1993), Texas Land Commissioner (1939–1955)
 Bernard Giles (born 1953), American serial killer
 Bill Giles (American football) (1932–1998), American football player and coach
 Bill Giles (baseball) (born 1934), honorary National League President
 Bill Giles (meteorologist) (born 1939), meteorologist and television presenter
 Billy Giles (1957–1998), Ulster Volunteer Force volunteer
 Bob Giles (born 1930), Australian rules footballer
 Brian Giles (second baseman) (born 1960), Major League Baseball player
 Brian Giles (born 1971), American Major League Baseball outfielder
 Bryant Giles (died 2018), Australian politician
 C. J. Giles (Chester Jarrel Giles, Jr.; born 1985), American-Bahraini basketball player
 Calum Giles (born 1972), English field hockey player
 Calvin Giles (born 1962), American politician, member of the Illinois House of Representatives (1993–2007)
 Cameron Giles, American rap artist
 Carl Giles (1916–1995), British cartoonist
 Catherine Dawson Giles (1878-1955), British watercolour painter
 Charles Tyrrell Giles (1850–1940), British lawyer and Conservative politician
 Chris Giles (born 1982), Welsh footballer
 Chris Giles (Irish footballer) (1928–2006)
 Christy Giles, Republic of Ireland footballer
 Clement Giles, South Australian parliamentarian (1887-1902)
 Cornelis Giles, 18th century Dutch navigator after whom Gilessundet is named
 Craig Giles, Australian country musician
 Curt Giles (born 1958), Canadian ice hockey defenceman
 Daniel Giles (c. 1725 – 1800), Governor of the Bank of England (1795–1797)
 David Giles (disambiguation), multiple people
 Edmund Giles, English lawyer and politician, member of the House of Commons (1656)
 Edward Giles (1566–1637), English politician, High Sheriff of Devon (1612–1613)
 Edward Giles (Australian politician) (1882–1946), Australian politician
 Eric Giles (1939–1990), New Zealand cricketer
 Ernest Giles (1835–1897), Australian explorer
 Felix Giles (1885–1950), Australian engineer and ANZAC officer
 Francis Giles (1787–1847), British canal engineer and surveyor
 Frank Giles (1919–2019), editor of the British Sunday Times newspaper (1981–1983)
 Frank Lucas Netlam Giles (1879–1930), British soldier and military attaché
 Frank S. Giles (1915–1991), American politician, Member of the Massachusetts House of Representatives (1947–1961)
 Gail Giles, American writer of young adult fiction
 Gary Giles (1940–2014), New Zealand cricketer
 Geoffrey Giles (1923–1990), Australian politician
 George Giles (baseball) (1909–1992), Negro leagues first baseman
 George Giles (1913–1973), New Zealand cyclist
 George Michael James Giles (1853–1916), English surgeon and entomologist
 Glenn Giles (born 1956), Australian rules footballer
 Godfrey Douglas Giles (1857–1941), war artist
 Godwin Giles (1876–1955), English cricketer
 Grover A. Giles (1892–1974), Attorney General of Utah (1941–1949)
 Gwen B. Giles (1932–1986), American politician, member of the Missouri Senate
 Harriet E. Giles (1828–1909), American educator, co-founder of Spelman College
 Harry Giles (disambiguation), multiple people
 Henry Giles (1809–1882), Unitarian minister and writer
 Herbert Giles (1845–1935), British diplomat, Sinologist and linguist
 Hiram Giles (1820-1895), American politician
 Howard Giles (born 1946), British-American sociolinguist
 Ian Giles (disambiguation), multiple people
 Jack Giles (Leonard George "Jack" Giles 1921–1994), Australian rules footballer and cricketer
 James Giles (disambiguation), multiple people
 Janice Holt Giles (1905–1979), American author
 Jarvis Giles (born 1990), American football running back
 Jesús Giles Sánchez (1961–2012), Mexican politician
 Jimmie Giles (born 1954), American football player
 Jimmy Giles (born 1946), English footballer and manager
 Jo Giles (1950–2011), New Zealand television presenter and sport shooter
 John Giles (disambiguation), multiple people
 Jonathan Giles (born 1988), Australian rules footballer
 Johnny Giles (born 1940), Irish football player, manager and pundit
 Katharine Giles (1978–2013), British climate scientist
 Keelan Giles (born 1997), Welsh rugby union player
 Keir Giles (born 1968), British writer and international affairs experts
 Ken Giles (born 1990), American baseball pitcher
 Kenneth Giles (died 1974), British crime writer
 Kevin Giles, Australian Anglican pastor, and theologian
 Kevin S. Giles (born 1952), American journalist
 Lamar Giles, American children's book author
 Lavarus Giles (born 1986), American and Canadian football running back
 Lee Giles, American computer scientist
 Leslie Giles (1906–1981), New Zealand cricketer
 Lionel Giles (1875–1958), Victorian scholar, translator, son of Herbert
 Lucy Giles (born c. 1969), first female College Commander at the Royal Military Academy Sandhurst (since 2015)
 Margaret Giles (1868–1949), British painter, sculptor and medallist
 Martin Giles (born 1979), English footballer
 Martyn Giles (born 1983), Welsh footballer
 Michael Giles (born 1942), drummer with King Crimson
 Marcus Giles (born 1978), Major League Baseball outfielder
 Maureen Giles (born 1938), Australian Olympic swimmer
 Molly Giles (born 1942), American writer
 Nancy Giles (born 1960), American actress and commentator
 Nathaniel Giles (1558 – 1633 or 1634), English Renaissance organist and composer
 Nathaniel Giles (priest) (1591 – not earlier than 1644), Canon of Windsor (1624–1644)
 Nick Giles, Managing Director of Ordnance Survey Leisure Limited
 Norman Giles (1915–2006), American microbial geneticist
 Olivia Aroha Giles, New Zealand artist and writer
 Owen Giles, English rugby player
 Pat Giles, Irish Teachta Dála
 Patricia Giles (née White; 1928–2017), Australian Senator (1981–1993)
 Paul Giles (born 1961), Welsh footballer and manager
 Peter Giles (disambiguation), several people
 Randall Giles (1950–2010), American composer, Episcopal Church missionary, and ethnographer
 Ray Giles (born 1961), Welsh rugby union player
 Richard P. Giles, American politician
 Robert Giles (civil servant) (1846–1928), British civil servant, Commissioner in Sind (1900–1902)
 Robert Giles (born 1933), American journalist
 Roger Giles, judge of the Court of Appeal of the Supreme Court of New South Wales
 Ron Giles (1919–2010), English cricketer
 Ron Giles (born 1942), American television executive
 Ronald Giles, Chief Judge of Michigan's 36th District Court
 Roscoe Giles, American physicist and computer engineer
 Roscoe Conkling Giles (1890–1970), American surgeon, President of the National Medical Association (1935)
 Roy Giles, British soldier and academic
 Ryan Giles (born 2000), English footballer
 Sam Giles, British palaeobiologist
 Samantha Giles (born 1971), English actress
 Samantha Giles (golfer) (born 1994), English golfer
 Sandra Giles (born Lelia Bernice Giles; 1932–2016), American actress and model
 Selina Giles (born 1972), English actress and writer
 Stephen Giles (born 1972), Canadian canoeist
 Stephen M. Giles, Australian children's book author
 Thomas Giles (disambiguation), multiple people
 Tim Giles, British jazz drummer
 Tony Giles, Australian rules footballer
 Trevor Giles, Gaelic footballer for Meath GAA
 Vinny Giles (Marvin M. Giles III; born 1943), American amateur golfer
 Warren Giles (1896–1979), National League executive in Major League Baseball
 Wenona Giles, Canadian academic
 William Giles (disambiguation), multiple people
 Winston Giles (born 1974), Australian musician
 Francis Charles Morgan-Giles (1883–1964), British boat designer and builder
 Morgan Morgan-Giles (1914–2013), British politician and Royal Navy officer
 Wilfrid Scott-Giles (1893–1982), English writer on heraldry

Notable people with the surname Gilles
 Alexe Gilles, American figure skater
 Herbert Michael Gilles (1921–2015), British-Maltese physician and professor of tropical medicine
 Jean Gilles (composer), 18th century French musician
 Jean Gilles (French general), 20th century French general
 Osmond Gilles, first colonial treasurer of South Australia
 Piper Gilles, American figure skater
 Todd Gilles, American figure skater

Notable people with the surname Gyles
 Abbey-Anne Gyles (born 1997), English model
 Alfred William Gyles (1888–1967), New Zealand chess player
 Althea Gyles (1867–1949), Irish poet
 Ced Gyles (born c. 1928), Canadian football player
 George Gyles (1877–1959), Canadian sailor
 Harry Gyles (1880–1959), Australian rules footballer
 Henry Gyles (1640–1709), English glass painter
 John Gyles (1678–1755), American interpreter
 John Gyles (MP) (died 1406), English politician
 Mascal Gyles (1595–1652), English polemic
 Roger Gyles (born 1938), Australian judge
 Thomas Gyles, English politician

Fictional characters
 Rupert Giles, a character from the  Buffy the Vampire Slayer television series 
 William Giles (Oz), a fictional inmate in the TV series) Oz
 Farmer Giles, protagonist of Farmer Giles of Ham by J. R. R. Tolkien

See also
 Gillis (surname)

English-language surnames
Surnames of Irish origin